Sami Kooheji (born 28 March 1984) is a Bahraini sailor. He competed in the Laser event at the 2004 Summer Olympics.

References

External links
 

1984 births
Living people
Bahraini male sailors (sport)
Olympic sailors of Bahrain
Sailors at the 2004 Summer Olympics – Laser
Place of birth missing (living people)
Sailors at the 2006 Asian Games
Sailors at the 2010 Asian Games